The Main Street Historic District of Easthampton, Massachusetts encompasses the historic heart of the town, running along Main Street between Northampton and Center Streets.  The area has been the civic and economic heart of the town since incorporation in 1785.  Most of the commercial buildings date from the 1840s to the 1880s, and are built in an Italianate style.  The housing stock of the district also includes Italianate styling, but there are also a number of Greek Revival structures.  The major civic structures of the town are in the district, including the town hall (brick, Italianate), public library (designed in 1881 by Peabody & Stearns in the Old English style), and the First Congregational Church, which is the second for the congregation, a brick Romanesque Revival building dating to 1851. The district was added to the National Register of Historic Places in 1986.

Easthampton was settled in the early 18th century, and was separately incorporated out of parts of Northampton and Southampton in 1786.  At first economically an agricultural community, its town center developed around its first meeting house, located about 1/4-mile south of the Manhan River, where an early gristmill and settlement were located.  Substantial growth in the town center began in the 1840s, when a boys' seminary was founded, and a button factory was founded on a tributary of the Manhan River southeast of the center, which was dammed to form what is now called Nashawannuck Pond .  This was the seed of a corridor of industrial development just east of the center, which grew in the mid-19th century along with this economic growth.

See also
National Register of Historic Places listings in Hampshire County, Massachusetts
United States Post Office–Easthampton Main
Nashawannuck Mills Historic District

References

Historic districts in Hampshire County, Massachusetts
National Register of Historic Places in Hampshire County, Massachusetts
Historic districts on the National Register of Historic Places in Massachusetts
Easthampton, Massachusetts